"Halfcrazy" is a song performed by Musiq Soulchild (then credited as Musiq), issued as the lead single from his second studio album Juslisen. The single was released only on vinyl; and it contains a sample of "Vivre Pour Vivre" by Francis Lai. The song is Musiq's biggest hit to date on the Billboard Hot 100, peaking at No. 16 in 2002.

Music video
Two official music videos were created for the song.

Background
According to the song's producers Carvin & Ivan, the song was originally offered to Dru Hill member Larry "Jazz" Anthony who was set to record a solo album for Def Jam Recordings. He initially refused on recording the song for his solo debut, rejecting the sample of "Vivre Pour Vivre" in favor of wanting it played with live instruments. Anthony then dropped the song from his album and "Halfcrazy" was later rewritten with new verses by Musiq.

Chart positions

Weekly charts

Year-end charts

References

External links
 
 

2002 singles
Def Jam Recordings singles
Music videos directed by Chris Robinson (director)
Music videos directed by Jessy Terrero
Musiq Soulchild songs
Songs with music by Francis Lai
2002 songs
Songs written by Carvin Haggins
Songs written by Ivan Barias
Song recordings produced by Carvin & Ivan
Songs written by Musiq Soulchild